The 2016–17 Belgian Third Amateur Division was the inaugural season of the division in its current format, replacing the former Belgian Fourth Division and now placed at the fifth-tier of football in Belgium.

The division consists of four separate leagues, leagues A and B consist of teams with a license from the Voetbalfederatie Vlaanderen (VFV, the Dutch speaking wing of the Belgian FA) and contain 16 teams each, while leagues C and D contain teams with a license from the Association des Clubs Francophones de Football (ACFF, the French speaking wing of the RBFA) and contain 14 teams each. The champions from each of the four leagues will promote to the 2017–18 Belgian Second Amateur Division. The fixtures were announced on 5 July 2016.

For the inaugural season the following teams participated:
 The two teams finishing last in groups A and B of the 2015–16 Belgian Third Division.
 35 teams in the groups A through D of the 2015–16 Belgian Fourth Division that either did not qualify in the top three for direct promotion, did not win promotion through the promotion play-offs or dissolved.
 23 teams promoted from the Belgian Provincial Leagues.

Belgian Third Amateur Division A

League table

Belgian Third Amateur Division B

League table

Belgian Third Amateur Division C

League table

Belgian Third Amateur Division D

League table

Promotion play-offs

Promotion play-offs VFV
The teams finishing in second place in the Third Amateur Division A and Third Amateur Division B will take part in a promotion playoff first round together with three period winners from both divisions. These 8 teams from the VFV will play the first round of a promotion-playoff, with normally only teams promoting to the 2017–18 Belgian Second Amateur Division. Depending on the number of VFV teams relegating from the 2016–17 Belgian First Amateur Division, more teams might get promoted which was the case this season as before the play-offs it was already known that on the VFV side at least four teams would gain promotion through the play-offs, due to the fact that Coxyde vacated its place and the upcoming merger between Izegem and Ingelmunster to form Mandel United. As a result, the four winning teams in the VFV Round 1 immediately received promotion, while the other teams continued the play-offs to determine the order in which possible further places would be awarded.

In Division A, champions Ingelmunster and second placed Wetteren won the three periods, allowing the next three teams in the league to take part: Pepingen, Ronse and Dikkelvenne. In Division B, Sint-Lenaarts and Vosselaar each won one period and were assured of a place in the play-offs before the end of the season, the other places were taken by City Pirates (for finishing second overall) and Diegem (the highest finisher not already qualified).

VFV Round 1

City Pirates, Ronse, Sint-Lenaarts and Vosselaar promoted to the 2017–18 Belgian Second Amateur Division. Diegem, Dikkelvenne, Pepingen and Wetteren continue into the VFV Round 2 where one extra place is available.

VFV Round 2

Dikkelvenne and Pepingen move to the VFV Round 3 to play for promotion, Diegem and Wetteren eliminated.

VFV Round 3

Pepingen promoted to the 2017–18 Belgian Second Amateur Division, Dikkelvenne eliminated.

Promotion play-offs ACFF
The team finishing in second place in the Third Amateur Division C and Third Amateur Division D will take part in a promotion playoff first round together with three period winners from both divisions. These 8 teams from the ACFF will play the first round of a promotion-playoff, with one team promoting to the 2017–18 Belgian Second Amateur Division.

In Division C, the top three teams had each won one period. With champions RWDM47 already promoted, the other places were taken by 4th placed Albert Quevy-Mons and 5th placed Tournai. In Division D, the champions Durbuy had won two periods, the other went to Tilleur who were joined in the play-offs by the teams finishing 3rd to 5th, Verlaine, Richelle and Mormont.

ACFF Round 1

Mormont, Rebecq, Richelle and Verlaine moved on to Round 2 while Albert Quevy-Mons, Francs Borains, Tilleur and Tournai were eliminated.

ACFF Round 2

Rebecq and Verlaine moved on to Round 3 to play for promotion. Mormont and Richelle played a match to determine third place in case extra promotion places would come up.

ACFF Round 3

Rebecq was promoted to the 2017–18 Belgian Second Amateur Division, while Verlaine was first in line to fill up any extra vacant spot in case the amount of ACFF teams relegating in leagues above would have increased. In the end, no places freed up and Verlaine remained in the Third Amateur Division.

Third place match

The third place match was played to determine the order in which teams would fill any extra promotion places, if they would become available. Behind Verlaine, Mormont was ranked above Richelle due to winning the third place match. However in the end no places freed up and both teams remained in the Third Amateur Division.

Relegation play-offs

ACFF

Warnant is relegated to the Belgian Provincial Leagues.

VFV

Before the match, it was not known whether an extra VFV team would be relegated, which depended on the result of the Second Amateur Division promotion play-offs. If an ACFF team won those promotion play-offs, then an extra VFV team would be relegated. By winning the match, Vlamertinge was sure of avoiding relegation, while losing team Diest were now dependent on the result of the only ACFF team in contention for promotion, RFC Liège. On 28 May 2017, RFC Liège lost the final match of the promotion play-off, resulting in Diest being also saved and avoiding relegation to the Belgian Provincial Leagues.

References

Belgian Third Amateur Division
Bel
5